No Easy Walk to Freedom is a 1986 studio album by American folk music trio Peter, Paul and Mary. Its release coincided with the group's 25th anniversary. Produced by John McClure and Peter Yarrow, the album was nominated in the Best Contemporary Folk Album category at the 29th Annual Grammy Awards.

Background and composition
Without a label, Peter, Paul and Mary signed with Gold Castle Records to record No Easy Walk to Freedom. Released in 1986, it marked the trio's 25th anniversary. The album was their first in almost nine years. The title track was written for Nelson Mandela. The group sought to connect the causes of Mandela and Martin Luther King Jr. A few years later, Peter, Paul and Mary would perform "No Easy Walk to Freedom" at an event in Tokyo honoring Mandela shortly after his release from prison. A music video for the song, directed by George Gage and Jim Shea, features archival footage depicting the group's involvement in human rights issues, along with performance clips. Other songs on the album include "El Salvador", a protest song about the United States' involvement in the Salvadoran Civil War, and "Light One Candle", written for Jewish dissidents in the Soviet Union.

Critical reception
No Easy Walk to Freedom received a 1987 Grammy Award nomination in the Best Contemporary Folk Album category. Billboard noted the group's "familiar formula of story-songs and socially conscious material" and described the album as "a pleasant return to form." A review in Digital Audio and Compact Disc Review wrote that the album's songs are "each stamped with PP&M's unique voice and harmonies, that deal not only with protest, but also with love, friendship, and childhood." Allmusic's L. Katz wrote, "This is one of the trio's later releases and, if their fire is a bit dimmed, one can't blame them. However, if you want a CD that brings you back to the dawn of the flower-child generation, this probably isn't the one." Keith Tuber of Orange Coast said: "Makes you wonder why it took 10 years and a new label to showcase the talent of these legendary performers." A review in the Reno Gazette-Journal called the album "an extraordinary comeback, a set of 10 political broadsides and topical ballads. The arrangements are clean and fresh and the performances are genuinely moving from start to finish."

Track listing

Side one
"Weave Me the Sunshine" (Peter Yarrow)
"Right Field" (Willy Welch)
"I'd Rather Be in Love" (Pat Alger, Walter Carter)
"State of the Heart" (Richard Kniss, Noel Paul Stookey)
"No Easy Walk to Freedom" (Margery Tabankin, Peter Yarrow)

Side two
"Greenland Whale Fisheries" (Fred Hellerman)
"Whispered Words" (Peter Yarrow)
"El Salvador" (Noel Paul Stookey)
"Greenwood" (Peter Yarrow)
"Light One Candle" (Peter Yarrow)

Charts

Personnel
Peter Yarrow – vocals, guitar
Noel "Paul" Stookey – vocals, guitar
Mary Travers – vocals
David Brown - acoustic guitar on tracks 1, 2, 3, 5, 7, 8, 9, 10
Anthony MacDonald - percussion on tracks 1, 2, 3, 5, 8, 10
Richard Kniss - acoustic bass on tracks 1, 2, 4, 6, 10
Eric Weinberg - banjo on track 2
Warren Bernhardt - keyboards on track 3
Anthony Jackson - electric bass on tracks 3, 5, 8
Ed Walsh - keyboards on tracks 4, 7, 8, 9
Mick Moloney - mandolin on track 6
Séamus Egan - penny whistle on track 6
Lori Cole - concertina on track 6
Jay Leonhart - acoustic bass on tracks 7, 9
New York Choral Society - chorus on track 10

References

External links 
 

Peter, Paul and Mary albums
1986 albums
PolyGram albums